Gene Greytak (November 14, 1925 – February 28, 2010) was a real estate broker, who made a career as an actor by impersonating Pope John Paul II because of his facial resemblance to the pontiff.

Greytak was Catholic, and had at least the tacit permission of the Archdiocese of Los Angeles to impersonate the pope. Greytak died on February 28, 2010.

Filmography

References

External links

 

1925 births
2010 deaths
American impressionists (entertainers)
Deaths from cancer in California
People from Trumbull, Connecticut
Catholics from Connecticut